Doin' Somethin' Right is the second studio album by American country music singer Billy Currington. It was released in October 2005 via Mercury Records Nashville. The album produced three singles with the songs "Must Be Doin' Somethin' Right", "Why, Why, Why", and "Good Directions", which peaked at numbers 1, 13, and 1, respectively, on the U.S. Billboard Hot Country Songs chart. The album has also been certified platinum by the Recording Industry Association of America (RIAA). Also included on this album is a cover of Kenny Rogers' hit single "Lucille".

Track listing

Personnel
 Eddie Bayers - drums (all tracks)
 Billy Currington - lead vocals (all tracks)
 Smith Curry - dobro (track 2), lap steel guitar (tracks 1,9)
 Chip Davis - background vocals (tracks 3,7,10)
 Stuart Duncan - fiddle (all tracks except 3,6,7), mandolin (tracks 3,6,7)
 Paul Franklin - steel guitar (tracks 3,5,6,7,8,10), lap steel guitar (track 11)
 Wes Hightower - background vocals (tracks 1,2,4,5,8,9,11)
 Brett James - background vocals (track 6)
 Brent Mason - electric guitar (tracks 3,4,5,6,7,8,11)
 Michael McDonald - piano (track 7), background vocals (track 7)
 Glen Mitchell - electric guitar (track 1,2,9,10)
 Gary Prim - keyboards (all tracks except 3 & 7), organ (track 7), piano (track 3), strings (track 3)
 Scotty Sanders - dobro (track 4)
 W. David Smith - bass guitar (tracks 3,4,5,6,7,8,11)
 John Willis - acoustic guitar (all tracks), banjo (track 4)
 Glenn Worf - bass guitar (tracks 1,2,9,10)

Chart performance

Weekly charts

Year-end charts

Singles

Certifications

References

2005 albums
Mercury Nashville albums
Billy Currington albums
Albums produced by Carson Chamberlain